Batnfjordelva is a river in Gjemnes Municipality in Møre og Romsdal county, Norway. It originates from the lake Botnvatnet and it flows to the east and later northeast until it empties into the Batnfjorden at the village of Batnfjordsøra.

The river is popular for fishing Atlantic Salmon, Sea Trout and migratory Char. The parasite Gyrodactylus salaris has been reported in the river, affecting its populations of Atlantic Salmon.

See also
List of rivers in Norway

References

Rivers of Møre og Romsdal
Gjemnes
Rivers of Norway